The Cinque Terre (meaning "Five Lands") is a coastal area within Liguria, in the northwest of Italy. It lies in the west of La Spezia Province, and comprises five villages: Monterosso al Mare, Vernazza, Corniglia, Manarola, and Riomaggiore. The coastline, the five villages, and the surrounding hillsides are all part of the Cinque Terre National Park, a UNESCO World Heritage Site.

The Cinque Terre area is a popular tourist destination. Over the centuries, people have built terraces on the rugged, steep landscape right up to the cliffs that overlook the Ligurian Sea. Paths, trains, and boats connect the villages as cars can only reach them with great difficulty from the outside via narrow and precarious mountain roads.

History
Cinque Terre is mentioned in documents dating to the 11th century. Monterosso and Vernazza were settled first and the other villages grew later, whilst within the territory of the Republic of Genoa. In the 16th century, the inhabitants reinforced existing forts and built new defence towers to defend the area from attacks by the Turks. Cinque Terre experienced an economic decline from the 17th to 19th centuries, recovering when an arsenal was built in La Spezia and it gained a railway link to Genoa. The railway led to migration from the area and a decline in traditional industries until the growth of tourism from the 1970s onwards brought some prosperity.

The predominant crops in the area have been grapes and olives. Some fisherman were based in Monterosso, but the area's gaily painted fisherman's cottages were conceived in the late 1970s as a tourist attraction.

On 25 October 2011 torrential rain caused floods and mudslides in Cinque Terre. Nine people were killed and villages were severely damaged, particularly Vernazza and Monterosso al Mare. 
The heavy rainfall event was favoured by the crisis of the traditional and less remunerative cultivation of terraced landscapes which sixty years before started a progressive decline and reduction of maintenance. It was partially balanced by the vegetation that spontaneously developed on abandoned terraces, a role underlined by a part of the existing scientific literature.

Transport and tourism

Access to Cinque Terre by car is limited. A road to Vernazza is very narrow and ends  before the town. Trains run from La Spezia to all five towns within Cinque Terre, as well as to major regional and national destinations. The Cinque Terre railway stations are located on the Genoa-Pisa line. Most long-distance trains do not stop at all five Cinque Terre towns, making it necessary to transfer from La Spezia onto regional trains. Some intercity trains also stop at Monterosso Station.

A scheduled passenger ferry runs between Levanto and La Spezia, stopping at all of the main villages except Corniglia, which does not have a landing point, as it is not located on the coast. Boats also connect to Genoa's Old Harbour, Lerici, and Porto Venere.

Paths 
Many walking trails run throughout the park and are named according to the SVA numbering system, however, it is common to hear trails referred to by their previous numbers, causing confusion to visitors.

Due to the unstable environment, landslides frequently cause portions of the trails to be closed. It is still possible to walk between these villages, although the trail is both steeper and longer than the closed path along the waterfront.

Culture

Literature 

From the poem, “The Lemons”, 1921. This is how the Nobel laureate Eugenio Montale, through his poetry, tells of the beauty of Monterosso and how the Cinque Terre must be discovered.

The Cinque Terre were not only a source of inspiration for Eugenio Montale but for many others.
 Dante Alighieri compared the Cinque Terre with the rugged cliff of Purgatory in the Divine Comedy.
 Boccaccio in the Tenth Day of the second novel in the Decameron: 

 Gabriele D'Annunzio in his work Faville del Maglio cite the DOC white wine 'Sciachetrà':

Cinema 
In 2013 Cinque Terre was one of the shooting locations of the movie The Wolf of Wall Street by Martin Scorsese.

The 2021 Disney/Pixar film Luca was set in the fictional town of Portorosso, on the Italian Riviera, placed west of Corniglia on a fictional map.  Portorosso was inspired by and modeled after Cinque Terre.

Videogames 
The 2016 videogame Hitman featured the fictional town of Sapienza, which was inspired by Vernazza and other towns on the Ligurian shoreline.

Food and wine

Given its location on the Mediterranean, seafood is plentiful in the local cuisine. Anchovies of Monterosso are a local speciality designated with a Protected Designation of Origin status from the European Union. The mountainsides of the Cinque Terre are heavily terraced and are used to cultivate grapes and olives. This area, and the region of Liguria, as a whole, is known for pesto, a sauce made from basil leaves, garlic, salt, olive oil, pine nuts, and pecorino cheese. Focaccia is a particularly common locally baked bread product.  Farinata, a typical snack found in bakeries and pizzerias, is a savoury and crunchy pancake made from a base of chick pea flour. The town of Corniglia is particularly popular for a gelato made from local honey.

The grapes of the Cinque Terre are used to produce two locally made wines. The eponymous Cinque Terre and the Sciachetrà are both made using Bosco, Albarola, and Vermentino grapes. Other DOC producers are Forlini-Capellini, Walter de Batté, Buranco, Arrigoni.

In addition to wines, other popular local drinks include grappa, a brandy made with the pomace left from winemaking, and limoncino, a sweet, creamy liqueur made from lemons. It is served chilled after meals and often used in the preparation of desserts.

Preservation
In 1998, the Italian Ministry for the Environment set up the Cinque Terre protected natural marine area to protect the natural environment and to promote socio-economic development compatible with the natural landscape of the area. Today, millions of visitors visit it every year. In 1999 the Parco Nazionale delle Cinque Terre was created to conserve the ecological balance, protect the landscape, and safeguard the anthropological values of the location. Nevertheless, dwindling interest in cultivation and maintenance of the terrace walls posed a long-term threat to the site, which was for this reason included in the 2000 and 2002 World Monuments Watch by the World Monuments Fund. The organization secured grants from American Express to support a study of the conservation of Cinque Terre. Following the study, a site management plan was created.

Neighbouring towns
 Bonassola
 La Spezia
 Lerici
 Levanto
 Porto Venere
 Sarzana
 Volastra

Sister cities
 Southland District, New Zealand

Gallery

See also
 Asteroid 273994 Cinqueterre
 Liguria wine

References

External links

Parco Nazionale delle Cinque Terre official site
Official UNESCO Photo gallery
Slideshow Photo gallery
"How a Village United to Save Cinque Terre's Ancient Terraces" MARCH 17, 2021 Atlas Obscura
Cinque Terre Card and Train Timetable
Cinque Terre Tips for First Time Visitors

Coasts of Italy
Italian Riviera
Ligurian Sea
Province of La Spezia
Coastal towns in Liguria
Hiking trails in Italy
Wine regions of Italy
World Heritage Sites in Italy
Tourist attractions in Liguria
Road-inaccessible communities of Europe